Ajam Boujarari Mohammed (born 3 April 1961), known as Samir, is a Moroccan professional football manager.

Coaching career
In 1998, Samir became assistant coach for Japan national football team under manager Philippe Troussier. After the 2002 FIFA World Cup, he became manager for J2 League club Shonan Bellmare in the 2003 season, but resigned on 25 May 2003.

Managerial statistics

References

External links

1961 births
Living people
Moroccan football managers
J2 League managers
Shonan Bellmare managers